Khojir National Park is the oldest protected area in Iran, located on the southern slopes of the Alborz Mountains east of Tehran in Tehran Province. It was established as a wildlife reserve in 1979 and promoted to national park in 1982.

History 
The area has been a royal game reserve since 1754 and was included in the Jajrood Protected Area in 1979.

The park contains within its confines the village of Khojir, and the "vast" Khojir missile production complex, which is owned by the Shahid Hemmat Industrial Group.

Flora 
Hemicryptophytes are the most abundant Raunkiær plant life-form occurring in Khojir National Park, with 116 species belonging to the Irano-Turanian Region.

Vegetation above  comprises foremost Persian pistachio tree (Pistacia atlantica), wild almond (Prunus lycioides), interspersed with buckthorn (Rhamnus pallasi), Persian juniper (Juniperus excelsa), wild cherry (Prunus cerasus), and Cotoneaster bushes.

Fauna 
Persian leopard and Asiatic wildcat were recorded during camera-trapping surveys in the protected area since 2005, and a Pallas’s cat for the first time in spring 2008.

References

National parks of Iran
Alborz (mountain range)